William Edward Irwin (1882 - February 5, 1916) was a 30-year-old replacement player in one game for the Detroit Tigers on May 18, 1912, after the regular team went on strike to protest the suspension of Ty Cobb, following Cobb's attack on a handicapped fan in New York. His last name is sometimes mistakenly given as "Irvin".

Biography
He was born in 1882.

Irwin had two triples in three at-bats against the Philadelphia Athletics. He shares the record with Cecil Bolton for most triples in a career with no other hits at two. Irwin was the only member of the replacement Tigers to get a hit in a 24-2 loss, although two members of the coaching staff (Deacon McGuire and Joe Sugden), who were pressed into service for that game, each got one hit.

Irwin's performance at third base was not as strong, as, despite being charged with only one error, Allan Travers, the pitcher for the replacement Tigers, later recalled: "I was doing fine until they started bunting. The guy playing third base had never played baseball before."

Irwin finished with a .500 fielding percentage at third base, and a .667 batting average, 2.000 slugging percentage, and 2.667 OPS.

Irwin died in 1916 from injuries suffered when he was thrown through a saloon window in Philadelphia, a shard of glass penetrating his jugular vein.

Legacy
A play about his life, The Perfect Hands of the Irresistible Ed was written by David James Brock.

References

External links

Ed Irwin at SABR (Baseball BioProject)

1882 births
1916 deaths
Detroit Tigers players
Major League Baseball third basemen
Baseball players from Pennsylvania
American murder victims
Male murder victims
People murdered in Pennsylvania
Portsmouth Cobblers players